Wolfgang is a German male given name.

Wolfgang may also refer to:

People
Walter Wolfgang (1923–2019), German-born British socialist and peace activist
Wolfgang (wrestler) (born 1986), Barry Young, Scottish wrestler with stage name "Wolfgang"
Wolfgang Amadeus Mozart (1756-1791), prolific and influential composer of classical music

Places
St. Wolfgang im Salzkammergut, a market town in central Austria
Sankt Wolfgang, a municipality in the district of Erding in Bavaria, Germany
Wolfgang Pass, Switzerland
Wolfgangsee, a lake in Austria

Music
Wolfgang (band), a Filipino heavy metal band
Wolfgang (album), 1995 studio album from the Filipino band
"Wolfgang" (song), a song by South Korean boy band Stray Kids
Wolf Gang, a British rock band
Odd Future, also known as Odd Future Wolf Gang Kill Them All, an American music collective from Los Angeles

Brands and enterprises
Peavey EVH Wolfgang, a guitar series
Wolfgang's Steakhouse, a steakhouse originating in Manhattan, New York

See also
 Farkas
 Sankt Wolfgang (disambiguation)